Robin Gareth Ellis  (born 8 December 1935) was the Archdeacon of Plymouth from 1982 to 2000.

Ellis was educated at Worksop College, Pembroke College, Oxford and Chichester Theological College After a curacy in Swinton he was Chaplain at his old school. He was Vicar of Swaffham Prior from, 1966 to 1974;  of  Wisbech from 1974 to 1982; and Vicar of Yelverton from 1982 to 1986.

References

1935 births
People educated at Worksop College
Alumni of Pembroke College, Oxford
Archdeacons of Plymouth
Alumni of Chichester Theological College
Living people
Anglo-Catholic clergy